DWIZ may refer to:

 DWIZ-AM, an AM radio station broadcasting in Metro Manila
 DWIZ-FM, an FM radio station broadcasting in Dagupan